Lai Chi Kok is a neighbourhood in Kowloon, Hong Kong, east of Kwai Chung and west of Cheung Sha Wan. Mei Foo Sun Chuen is the largest housing estate in the area and also the largest in Hong Kong with 99 blocks. Administratively, it belongs to Sham Shui Po District.

History
Lai Chi Kok literally means "lychee corner", referring to a river named after a type of fruit tree native to China. However, some historians such as Leung Ping Wah suggsted the original name of the region was Lai Tsai Kuok (孺仔脚), literally mean the footprint of the youngest son . The river once separated Cheung Sha Wan from Lai Chi Kok Bay, and a river from Butterfly Valley separated Cheung Sha Wan from Lai Chi Kok.  At the innermost area of Lai Chi Kok Bay, namely present-day Lai King Hill Road, is a settlement called Kau Wa Keng.

The Qing government had set up a customs station in Lai Chi Kok, to collect customs duties after ceding Hong Kong Island and Kowloon Peninsula to the British. After the lease of the New Territories, the British reclaimed Lai Chi Kok for military use. A torpedo storage facility was also erected on the west point of Lai Chi Kok Bay, an area near Kwai Chung. 

At the time of the 1911 census, the population of Lai Chi Kok was 173.

Buildings
Lai Chi Kok Hospital is a special hospital located on the original location of the cap. Its neighbour, the Lai Chi Kok Reception Centre, is managed by the Hong Kong Correctional Services. At one point, the Lai Chi Kok Incinerator was one of three incinerators in Hong Kong; however, it was demolished because it released pollutants into the Hong Kong air. The headquarters of the Kowloon Motor Bus was also in Lai Chi Kok, before being relocated; the site has since been replaced by a private housing project called Manhattan Hill.

Transport

The area is served by Mei Foo station on the MTR Tsuen Wan line and Tuen Ma line. The MTR's Lai Chi Kok station is actually in Cheung Sha Wan, not Lai Chi Kok. Mei Foo is a transportation hub due to its geographic location in the north-western end of Kowloon. Lai Chi Kok Road is named after this place, but most part of the road lies outside Lai Chi Kok.

Education
Lai Chi Kok is in Primary One Admission (POA) School Net 40. Within the school net are multiple aided schools (operated independently but funded with government money) and two government schools: Fuk Wing Street Government Primary School and Li Cheng Uk Government Primary School.

Footnotes

See also

Cheung Sha Wan
Mei Foo Sun Chuen

 
Capes of Hong Kong
Sham Shui Po District
New Kowloon